Šarovce is a village and municipality in the Levice District in the Nitra Region of Slovakia.

History
In historical records the village was first mentioned in 1075.

Geography
Sarovce lies at an altitude of 146 meters and covers an area of 25.379 km². Its population is about 1,650.

Ethnicity
Sarovce is about 47% Magyar, 38% Slovak, 14% Gypsy and 1% Czech.

Facilities
Sarovce has a public library, a sports gymnasium, and a football pitch.

External links
http://www.statistics.sk/mosmis/eng/run.html
http://www.sarovce.sk/pages/nasa-obec.php

Villages and municipalities in Levice District